The 2004 Irish presidential election was scheduled for Friday, 22 October 2004. However, nominations closed at noon on 1 October and the incumbent president, Mary McAleese, who had nominated herself in accordance with the provisions of the Constitution, was the only candidate nominated. Accordingly, she was re-elected for a second seven-year term of office without the need to hold an election. This was the third time a president was returned unopposed, following Seán T. O'Kelly in 1952, and Patrick Hillery in 1983. McAleese was inaugurated for her second term on Thursday, 11 November 2004.

Nomination procedure
Under Article 12 of the Constitution of Ireland, a candidate for president could be nominated by:
at least twenty of the 226 serving members of the Houses of the Oireachtas, or
at least four of 34 county or city councils, or
a former or retiring president, on their own nomination.

The Minister for the Environment, Heritage and Local Government made the order opening nominations on 13 September, with noon on 1 October as the deadline for nominations, and 22 October set as the date for a contest, if any.

Nomination by Mary McAleese
Mary McAleese nominated herself as a candidate on 24 September.

McAleese had the support of the government parties Fianna Fáil and the Progressive Democrats, who had nominated her in the 1997 election. She also had the support of opposition parties Fine Gael and Sinn Féin, while the Labour Party and the Green Party had considered contesting the election, but ultimately voted against doing so (see below).

Other potential candidates

Dana Rosemary Scallon
Dana Rosemary Scallon had contested the 1997 presidential election and had served as an MEP from 1999 until her defeat in 2004. Dana sought a nomination from local authorities, as she had done in 1997, but received only the nomination of Galway City Council. After failing to secure a nomination from local authorities, she wrote to every member of the Oireachtas seeking a nomination. She had the support for a time of Independent TD Jerry Cowley, but he later withdrew his support. Dana made an appeal to the President of the High Court on the day of the close of nominations, but was unsuccessful. A challenge by a lay litigant to extend the time for nomination to allow for Dana to be nominated failed in the High Court.

Labour Party
In early 2003, the Labour Party stated that it would run a candidate, irrespective of the attitudes of other parties, and even in the event of the president seeking a second term. But party leader Pat Rabbitte appeared less committed during a television interview in November 2003, pointing out that all the party's attentions were focused on the two Irish elections already set for 2004, the European Parliament election and the local elections to be held on 11 June 2004. However, former Minister for Arts, Culture and the Gaeltacht Michael D. Higgins expressed in interest in contesting the election for the Labour Party.

On 15 September 2004, the party's parliamentary party recommended not running a candidate. The final decision was taken by the party's executive body, the National Executive, on 17 September 2004, which decided by 13 votes to 12 against running a candidate.

Green Party
Green Party TD Eamon Ryan let it be known that he was interested in seeking a nomination to run. However, practical difficulties included a lack of support from non-Green Party parliamentarians (fourteen of whom would be needed to nominate, as well as the six Green Party TDs), Mary McAleese's personal popularity, and funding issues. Having been endorsed by the party leadership, Ryan subsequently withdrew his name before a meeting of the Green Party National Council and the Green Party ultimately did not run a candidate.

Result
The only candidate nominated was Mary McAleese and she was declared elected at the close of nominations on 1 October.

References

Presidential
Presidential
Michael D. Higgins
Presidential elections in Ireland
Uncontested elections
October 2004 events in Europe